The Saint John the Baptist Basilica, also known as the Shrine of La Virgen Milagrosa de Badoc, is a Roman Catholic church in Badoc, in the northern Philippine province of Ilocos Norte. The basilica houses the Virgin Milagrosa statue of the Virgin Mary. It is dedicated to John the Baptist and has the title of a minor basilica since 2018. It was built in the 17th century in the Baroque style.

History 
The architect of the church is Brother Antonio Estavillo, OSA, who also built the Church of St. Augustine in Paoay, which is recognized as a world heritage site. It is one of the eleven Baroque Fil Hispanic churches in Ilocos Norte. The side walls of the single-nave church are reinforced with massive buttress walls to protect against earthquakes. To the left of the entrance to the church is a bell tower.

The church was converted into a parish church in 1714 when it was separated from the parish of St. Nicholas of Tolentino (now also a basilica) in Sinait. In November 2018 the elevation of the church to a basilica minor was announced.

Virgen Milagrosa 
The church is also a Marian shrine, it houses the statue of the miraculous Virgin Mary, the Virgen Milagrosa. The story traces the life-size statue back to Nagasaki in Japan. It is said to have been given to the sea by Christians in Japan who were in secret because of the persecution during the Tokugawa regime, along with a miraculous statue of Christ of the Black Nazarene. The statues came ashore in 1620 at Paguetpet on the border between Sinait and Badoc.. The statue of Mary came to Badoc, the statue of Christ to Sinait. The statue of the Virgin Mary was canonically crowned in May 31, 2018.

References 

Roman Catholic churches in Ilocos Norte
Baroque church buildings in the Philippines
17th-century Roman Catholic church buildings in the Philippines
Baroque architecture in the Philippines
Basilica churches in the Philippines
Spanish Colonial architecture in the Philippines
Churches in the Roman Catholic Diocese of Laoag